Friesea is a large genus of springtails belonging to the family Neanuridae.

The genus has cosmopolitan distribution.

Selected species
 Friesea acuminata (Denis)
 Friesea antarctica (Willem, 1901, 1902)
 Friesea claviseta
 Friesea eureka Greenslade, 2018
 Friesea fantaba Greenslade, 2018
 Friesea grisea Schaffer, 1891
 Friesea malvinensis Najt & Rubio, 1979
 Friesea mirabilis
 Friesea topo Greenslade, 1995
 Friesea woyciechowskii Weiner, 1982

References

Neanuridae
Springtail genera